Gunthorpe Bridge is a bridge over the River Trent at Gunthorpe, Nottinghamshire.

History

Until 1875, the only way to cross the river was by ferry, or ford.

The Gunthorpe Bridge Company was formed in the 1870s to build the bridge. A capital of £7,500, was raised in £10 shares. The foundation stone was laid in 1873 and the bridge opened in 1875. It was built largely in iron.

The tolls were:
horse and carriage 1/-,
horse and wagon 6d,
horse alone 3d,
people and passengers 1d,
motorcycles 3d,
cars 1/-
lorries 2/6,

It was only able to handle 6 tons of weight and with the advent of commercial vehicular traffic it was determined a modern structure was needed. The Nottinghamshire County Council (Gunthorpe Bridge) Act 1925 empowered Nottinghamshire County Council to buy out the owners, demolish the bridge and replace it with the present one.

The current bridge is a three span, reinforced concrete arch bridge. It was built in 1927, 400 metres upstream from the old one, with new bypass roads for the Gunthorpe and East Bridgford villages. The central arch spans 38.1 metres. The two side arches span 30.9 metres. Each of the three arches contains four ribs.

See also

List of crossings of the River Trent

References

Bridges in Nottinghamshire
Bridges across the River Trent
Bridges completed in 1875
Bridges completed in 1927
Former toll bridges in England